Stanley Arthur Potter (3 June 1914 – 10 January 1978) was a British sailor. He competed at the 1952 Summer Olympics and the 1956 Summer Olympics.

References

External links
 
 

1914 births
1978 deaths
British male sailors (sport)
Olympic sailors of Great Britain
Sailors at the 1952 Summer Olympics – Star
Sailors at the 1956 Summer Olympics – Star
Sportspeople from London